A super-puff is a type of exoplanet with a mass only a few times larger than
Earth's but with a radius larger than that of Neptune, giving it a very low mean density. They are cooler and less massive than the inflated low-density hot-Jupiters.

The most extreme examples known are the three planets around Kepler-51 which are all Jupiter-sized but with densities below 0.1 g/cm3. These planets were discovered in 2012 but their low densities were not discovered until 2014.
Another example is Kepler-87c.

One hypothesis is that a super-puff has continuous outflows of dust to the top of its atmosphere (for example, Gliese 3470 b)- so the apparent surface is really dust at the top of the atmosphere. Another possibility is that some of the super-puff planets are smaller planets with large ring systems, like HIP 41378 f.

References

Types of planet